Godadi is a Gujarati word for a blanket. It is a special kind of blanket, embroidered and made by patching various pieces of cloth. Godadi used to be handmade by housewives from Gujarat, especially from the Kutch district. Today in Gujarat, the "Godadi" word is taken as a general term for blanket that is available in the supermarkets and shopping malls. However, people who know the "Godadi" word will always picture embroidered cloth that is used as a blanket.

History
In 19s, there were no factories or production outlets for woollen or cotton blankets at villages of Punjab and Gujarat. In the beginning, unused pieces of cloths like a piece of a shirt, sari and other clothes, were collected over time and with a design in mind to make a good blanket, girls from the Bhuj, Gujarat used to sew these pieces of cloth together, after cutting them into different shapes. Over time, pieces of cotton became available in the market which helped girls and housewives to make a well designed blanket by embedding them with different designs. The tradition of making handmade blankets has continued into the 21st century. Many village people from Kutch, Gujarat export their blankets to different states of India. Due to consideration of heritage designs, this types of blankets are still popular and used by many people in India.

Availability of handmade Godadi
Till date, there are many places and stores in Kutch where handmade Godadis are sold. There is a variety of Godadis, such as designed Godadi from the same piece of cotton cloth, Embroidery Godadi and Godadi from patched clothes.

References

External links
 Embroidered tales of Banni.

Textile arts of India
Indian clothing
Bedding